Per Sanderud (born 1 November 1953) is a Norwegian civil servant.

He was born in Oslo, and is a cand.oecon. by education. He served as deputy under-secretary of state in the Ministry of Agriculture from 1989 to 1993, and in the Ministry of Transport and Communications from 1993 to 1997. He then served as permanent under-secretary of state in the same ministry from 1997 to 2005, and in the Ministry of Trade and Industry from 2005 to 2007. In 2007 he was appointed as president of the European Free Trade Association Surveillance Authority. In 2011 he was appointed director of the Norwegian Water Resources and Energy Directorate, retiring in 2018.

References

1953 births
Living people
Civil servants from Oslo
Directors of government agencies of Norway